Jean-Paul Didierlaurent (2 March 1962 – 5 December 2021) was a French writer.

Career
He is best known for the novel The Reader on the 6.27 (Le liseur du 6h27, 2014), translated into English by Ros Schwartz and published by Pan Books in 2015.

Didierlaurent was awarded the 2015 Cezam Prix Littéraire Inter CE for Le liseur du 6h27.

Didierlaurent's second novel Le reste de leur vie was also translated by Ros Schwartz and was published as The Rest of Their Lives by Mantle in 2017.

References

1962 births
2021 deaths
French male writers
French male novelists
People from Vosges (department)